M. Saeed Mirza is a Pakistani-Canadian researcher and Emeritus Professor of Civil Engineeing at McGill University. He is a recipient of the Order of Canada.
Mirza is known for his works on structural engineering and rehabilitation of infrastructure. A festschrift in his honor was published in June 2006.

References 

Living people
Canadian civil engineers
Academic staff of McGill University
Pakistani civil engineers
Members of the Order of Canada
McGill University alumni
University of Karachi alumni
Year of birth missing (living people)